Ganymede has been divided into 15 quadrangles.

References

External links
https://web.archive.org/web/20080328104312/http://webgis.wr.usgs.gov/pigwad/down/Jovian_satellites.htm

Surface features of Ganymede (moon)
Ganymede (moon)